Czarnolas  is a village in the administrative district of Gmina Policzna, within Zwoleń County, Masovian Voivodeship, in east-central Poland.

Czarnolas is famous as the residence of the Polish Renaissance poet, Jan Kochanowski.

The village's name translates to "blackwood" or "black forest".

History 
The village belonged to the Kochanowski family for a century, then frequently changed owners.  In 1830, on the site of the poet's manor house, which had burned down, a Neogothic chapel was erected.  In 1961, in the Jabłonowski family's 19th-century manor house, within a picturesque garden, was established the Jan Kochanowski Museum, before which stands a statue of the poet by M. Welter.

From 1975 to 1998, tje village was part of Radom Voivodeship.

References

Czarnolas
Jan Kochanowski